This article lists counts palatine of Lotharingia, counts palatine of the Rhine, and electors of the Palatinate, three titles whose holders ruled some part of Rhine area in the Kingdom of Germany and the Holy Roman Empire from 915 to 1803. Each title was a kind of count palatine. Since 1261 (formally 1356), the title holder had become a member of the small group of prince-electors who elected the emperor of the Holy Roman Empire. Since then, the title had been also called as Elector Palatinate

Counts palatine of Lotharingia 915–1085

The Palatinate emerged from the County Palatine of Lotharingia which came into existence in the 10th century.

 Wigeric of Lotharingia, count of the Bidgau ( 915/916–922)
 Godfrey, count of the Jülichgau (c. 940)

House of Ezzonen
During the 11th century, the Palatinate was dominated by the Ezzonian dynasty, which governed several counties on both banks of the Rhine. These territories were centered around Cologne-Bonn, but extended south to the rivers Moselle and Nahe. The southernmost point was near Alzey.

 Hermann I of Lotharingia 945–996
 Ezzo of Lotharingia 996–1034
 Otto I of Lotharingia 1034–1045 (Duke of Swabia 1045–1047)
 Henry I of Lotharingia 1045–1060/1061
 Hermann II of Lotharingia 1061/1064–1085 (in tutelage to Anno II, archbishop of Cologne until 1064)

Counts palatine of the Rhine 1085–1214

From 1085, after the death of the last Ezzonian count palatine, Herman II of Lotharingia, the Palatinate lost its military importance in Lotharingia. The territorial authority of the count palatine was reduced to his counties along the Rhine, henceforth called the County Palatine of the Rhine.

 Heinrich II of Laach 1085–95
 Siegfried of Ballenstedt 1095–1113
 Gottfried of Kalw 1113–29
 William of Ballenstedt 1129–39
 Henry IV Jasomirgott 1139–42
 Hermann III of Stahleck 1142–55

Hohenstaufen counts palatine
The first hereditary count palatine of the Rhine was Conrad of Hohenstaufen, who was the younger brother of Emperor Frederick Barbarossa. The territories attached to this hereditary office began with those held by the Hohenstaufens in Franconia and Rhineland. (Other branches of the Hohenstaufen dynasty received territories including lands in Swabia and Franche-Comté). Part of this land derived from their imperial ancestors, the Salian Emperors, and part from Conrad's maternal ancestors, the Saarbrücken. This explains the composition of the inheritance that comprised the Upper and Rhenish Palatinate in the following centuries.

 Conrad of Hohenstaufen 1156–95

Welf counts palatine
In 1195, the Palatinate passed to the House of Welf through the marriage of Agnes, heir to the Staufen count.
 Henry V of Welf 1195–1213
 Henry VI of Welf 1213–14

The Palatinate under the Wittelsbach: the Electoral dignity (1214–1803)

On the marriage of the Welf heiress Agnes in the early 13th century, the territory passed to the Wittelsbach dukes of Bavaria, who were also counts palatine of Bavaria.
During a later division of territory among the heirs of Duke Louis II of Upper Bavaria in 1294, the elder branch of the Wittelsbachs came into possession of both the Rhenish Palatinate and the territories in Bavaria north of the Danube river (the Nordgau) centred around the town of Amberg. As this region was politically connected to the Rhenish Palatinate, the name Upper Palatinate (Oberpfalz) became common from the early 16th century, to contrast with the Lower Palatinate along the Rhine.

The Golden Bull of 1356, in circumvention of inner-Wittelsbach contracts and thus bypassing Bavaria, the Palatinate was recognized as one of the secular electorates. The count was given the hereditary offices of archsteward (Erztruchseß) of the Empire and Imperial Vicar (Reichsverweser) of Franconia, Swabia, the Rhine and southern Germany. From that time forth, the Count Palatine of the Rhine was usually known as the Elector Palatine (Kurfürst von der Pfalz). The position of prince-elector had existed earlier (for example, when two rival kings of Germany were elected in 1257: Richard of Cornwall and Alfonso X of Castile), though it is difficult to determine exactly the earliest date of the office.

By the early 16th century, owing to the practice of dividing territories among different branches of the family, junior lines of the Palatine Wittelsbachs came to rule in Simmern, Kaiserslautern and Zweibrücken in the Lower Palatinate, and in Neuburg and Sulzbach in the Upper Palatinate.  The Elector Palatine, now based in Heidelberg, adopted Lutheranism in the 1530s and Calvinism in the 1550s.

House of Wittelsbach

Partitions of Palatinate under Wittelsbach rule

Table of rulers

Electors of Bavaria and Counts Palatine of the Rhine, 1777–1803

Later history

Following the great restorations of 1815, the Lower Palatinate (albeit without any prince-elector role) was restored as one of eight Bavarian Districts. After World War II the American Military Government of Germany took the Lower Palatinate from Bavaria and merged it with neighbouring territories to form a new state called Rhineland-Palatinate (German: Rheinland-Pfalz) with Mainz as the state capital. The people had felt neglected by the governments in Munich for generations and later approved the merger in a plebiscite.

The present head of the House of Wittelsbach, Franz, Duke of Bavaria (born 1933), is still traditionally styled as His Royal Highness the Duke of Bavaria, Duke of Franconia and in Swabia, Count Palatine of the Rhine.

Notes

Lists of counts
Lists of German nobility
Lists of office-holders in Germany
Holy Roman Empire-related lists
 
 

et:Pfalzi kuurvürstkond#Pfalzi kuurvürstkonna valitsejate loend